Sir Richard Hilton Marler Thompson, 1st Baronet (5 October 1912 – 15 July 1999) was a British Conservative politician.

Thompson was born in Chesterfield Derbyshire, the son of Richard South Thompson (1868–1952) and Kathleen Hilda née Marler (d. 1916). He was educated at Malvern College and in India, Burma and Sri Lanka and worked in Calcutta and the Far East in business. In World War II, he served in the Royal Navy as an ordinary seaman and became a lieutenant-commander in the Royal Navy Volunteer Reserve. He was serving on HMS Hermione in 1942 when the ship was sunk whilst part of the Malta convoy. He became a director of two publishing companies and was a trustee of the British Museum.

Thompson was elected as Member of Parliament for Croydon West in 1950, defeating Labour MP David Rees-Williams, then for the new Croydon South seat in 1955. He joined the Whips' Office as a junior whip in 1952, then as Lord Commissioner of the Treasury in 1954 and Vice-Chamberlain of the Household in 1956. He was Parliamentary Secretary to the Ministry of Health 1957–59, Under-Secretary of State for Commonwealth Relations 1959-60 and Parliamentary Secretary to the Ministry of Works 1960–62.

In 1963 he was created a Baronet, of Reculver in the County of Kent.

Thompson lost his seat to Labour's David Winnick in 1966, but regained it in 1970. He retired at the February 1974 general election.

Thompson married Anne Christabel de Vere Annesley on 9 August 1939 in Blean Kent, the daughter of Philip de Vere Annesley (1879–1949) and Christabel Charlotte née Tomson (1887–1955).

Sir Richard died on 15 July 1999 in Ashford Kent, Anne Christabel died in February 2003 in Kingston upon Thames.

Sir Richard was succeeded by his only son Nicholas Annesley Marler Thompson born 19 March 1947 at Bridge Kent, who inherited the baronetcy in 1999. Sir Nicholas is chairman of the executive committee of The Standing Council of the Baronetage. He married Venetia Catherine Heathcote (b. 22 April 1951) the daughter of John Horace Broke Heathcote (28 December 1910 – 30 May 2003) and Dorelle Geraldine née Rice (13 March 1913 – 11 May 2007) on 10 December 1982 at St Margaret's church Westminster. They have four children:

 Simon William Thompson (b. 10 June 1985)
 Charles Frederick Thompson (b. 25 November 1986)
 David Jonathan Thompson (b. 20 April 1990)
 Emma Louise Thompson (b. 24 July 1991)

Arms

References

External links 
 

1912 births
1999 deaths
People educated at Malvern College
Royal Navy officers
Baronets in the Baronetage of the United Kingdom
Conservative Party (UK) MPs for English constituencies
Politics of the London Borough of Croydon
UK MPs 1950–1951
UK MPs 1951–1955
UK MPs 1955–1959
UK MPs 1959–1964
UK MPs 1964–1966
UK MPs 1970–1974
Royal Naval Volunteer Reserve personnel of World War II
Trustees of the British Museum
Ministers in the third Churchill government, 1951–1955
Ministers in the Eden government, 1955–1957
Ministers in the Macmillan and Douglas-Home governments, 1957–1964